KZNN 105.3 FM is a radio station licensed to Rolla, Missouri.  The station broadcasts a country music format and is owned by KTTR-KZNN, Inc.

KZNN is the local affiliate for The Big Time with Whitney Allen show. They also feature local radio personalities & feature local traffic/news/weather in partnership with Results Radio.

References

External links
KZNN's website

ZNN
Country radio stations in the United States